Sciota lucipetella is a species of snout moth in the genus Sciota. It was described by Jalava in 1978. It is found in Finland, Estonia and Latvia. It has also been recorded in Russia.

The wingspan is 17–22 mm.

References

External links
lepiforum.de

Moths described in 1978
Phycitini
Moths of Europe